The president of the Government of Navarre, is the premier of the devolved government of the Chartered Community of Navarre.

Election 
Investiture processes to elect the regional president require for an absolute majority—more than half the votes cast—to be obtained in the first ballot. If unsuccessful, a new ballot will be held 24 hours later requiring only of a simple majority—more affirmative than negative votes—to succeed. If such majorities are not achieved, successive candidate proposals would be processed under the same procedure. In the event of the investiture process failing to elect a regional president within a three-month period from the election date, the Parliament will be automatically dissolved and a snap election called.

List of officeholders 
Since the first democratic elections of 1979 there have been two presidents of UCD in the Deputation of Navarre. Subsequently, the Government of Navarre has had two presidents of PSN, three of UPN and one of Geroa Bai. Presently Maria Chivite is President of Navarre. She was appointed to this post in August 2019.

Governments:

Timeline

Notes

References

Government of Navarre